Quercus hintonii is a rare species of oak. It is endemic to the central Mexican State of Mexico.

The leaves are thick and leathery, up to 21 cm long, elliptical or egg-shaped, very often with no teeth or lobes but sometimes with a few pointed teeth.

The species is threatened by habitat loss.

References

hintonii
Endemic oaks of Mexico
Trees of the State of Mexico
Critically endangered biota of Mexico
Critically endangered flora of North America
Plants described in 1939
Taxonomy articles created by Polbot
Flora of the Trans-Mexican Volcanic Belt